Darling is a 2012 Indian Bengali romance film written and directed by Raaj Mukherjee, starring Mayukh Mazumdar, Pamela Mandal and Riya Chanda. The film is produced by Nalin Singh and co-produced by Ajesh Gugnani, and features music scored by Subhayu Bedajna, while the cinematography is by Sandip Sen. This film is the Bengali Remake of the Telugu film Darling starring Prabhas and Kajal Aggarwal.

Cast
 Mayukh Mazumdar as Surya
 Pamela Mandal as Diya
 Riya Chanda as Payal
 Aishwariya

Plot
The film begins with an enthusiastic 1980's backdrop. Four college mates disperse after farewell and they keep themselves in contact even after decades. Mayukh is the son of one of the old friends and Aishwariya is the daughter of the other. They live in different places. A girl Riya falls in love with Mayukh and proposes to him. But he rejects the proposal. The father of the girl who happens to be a goon, surrounds Mayukh and his friends' for rejecting his daughter. To escape from the goon Mayukh narrates his flash back stating that he has a love interest, Aishwariya who he met in GOA . The goon feels sympathetic and leaves him after listening to the story. After a while, the old friends wish to have an old friends' reunion with families. They all meet in a village and now Mayukh and Aishwariya meet once again.

Soundtrack

The soundtrack and background score is composed by Subhayu Bedajna]. Six songs are performed by leading Bollywood singers – Shaan, Kunal Ganjawala, Soham Chakraborty, June Banerjee and Pamela Jain. Three songs lyrics are written by Raaj Mukherjee, the other three songs lyrics are written by Gautam Sushmit.

References

 
 "Music of DARLING released - BollywoodTrade". 6 March 2012.
 "Music of 'Darling' released - India Blooms News Service". 6 March 2012.
 "Darling - Raaj Mukherjee’s Latest Film". 5 March 2012.
 "Darling - Raaj Mukherjee’s Next Directorial Venture".

2012 films
Bengali remakes of Telugu films
Bengali-language Indian films
2010s Bengali-language films